Thomas Whatley (born March 23, 1953) is an American retired sprinter.

References

1953 births
Living people
American male sprinters
Place of birth missing (living people)
Universiade medalists in athletics (track and field)
Universiade gold medalists for the United States
Medalists at the 1973 Summer Universiade